A bigot is someone intolerant of others' differing ideas, races, genders, religions, politics, etc.

Bigot may also refer to:

Bigot (surname)
Bigot (espionage)